The 2024–25 UEFA Nations League will be the fourth season of the UEFA Nations League, an international association football competition involving the men's national teams of the member associations of UEFA. The competition will be held from September to November 2024 (league phase), March 2025 (League A quarter-finals and promotion/relegation play-offs) and June 2025 (Nations League Finals).

Format
The UEFA national teams will be divided into four leagues, with Leagues A, B and C featuring 16 teams each, divided into four groups of four teams. League D will feature 7 teams divided into two groups, with one containing four teams and the other containing three. The teams are allocated to leagues based on the 2022–23 UEFA Nations League overall ranking. Each team will play six matches within their group, except for one group in League D which will play four, using the home-and-away round-robin format on double matchdays in the FIFA International Match Calendar.

On 25 January 2023, the UEFA Executive Committee confirmed a modified format for the Nations League following the league phase. In the top division, League A, the group winners and runners-up will advance to a new quarter-final round, played home-and-away over two legs in March 2025. The winners will qualify for the Nations League Finals, retaining its previous format, which is played in a knockout format, consisting of the semi-finals, third place play-off and final. The semi-final pairings, along with the administrative home teams for the third place play-off and final, are determined by means of a draw. The host country will be selected among the four qualified teams by the UEFA Executive Committee, with the winners of the final crowned as the Nations League champions.

Teams also compete for promotion and relegation to a higher or lower league. In Leagues B, C and D, the group winners are promoted, while the last-placed teams of each group in Leagues A and B are relegated. As League C has four groups while League D has only two, the two worst-ranked League C teams will automatically be relegated (a change from the previous editions, which featured relegation play-outs between the fourth-placed teams of League C). As part of the format change, promotion/relegation play-offs will also be introduced, with the third-placed teams of League A facing the runners-up of League B, and the third-placed teams of League B facing the runners-up of League C. The matches will be played home-and-away over two legs in March 2025, with the winners going to the higher league and the losers entering the lower league.

In all two-legged ties, the team that scores more goals on aggregate is the winner. If the aggregate score is level, extra time is played (the away goals rule is not applied). If the score remains level after extra time, a penalty shoot-out is used to decide the winner.

Tiebreakers for group ranking

If two or more teams in the same group are equal on points on completion of the league phase, the following tie-breaking criteria are applied:
 Higher number of points obtained in the matches played among the teams in question;
 Superior goal difference in matches played among the teams in question;
 Higher number of goals scored in the matches played among the teams in question;
 If, after having applied criteria 1 to 3, teams still have an equal ranking, criteria 1 to 3 are reapplied exclusively to the matches between the teams in question to determine their final rankings. If this procedure does not lead to a decision, criteria 5 to 11 apply;
 Superior goal difference in all group matches;
 Higher number of goals scored in all group matches;
 Higher number of away goals scored in all group matches;
 Higher number of wins in all group matches;
 Higher number of away wins in all group matches;
 Lower disciplinary points total in all group matches (1 point for a single yellow card, 3 points for a red card as a consequence of two yellow cards, 3 points for a direct red card, 4 points for a yellow card followed by a direct red card).
 Position in the 2024–25 UEFA Nations League access list.
Notes

2026 FIFA World Cup qualification

The 2024–25 UEFA Nations League may be partially linked with European qualification for the 2026 FIFA World Cup, as was done with the 2020–21 Nations League. However, no decision has yet been made.

Schedule
Below is the schedule of the 2024–25 UEFA Nations League.

Teams

All 55 UEFA national teams are able to submit an entry for the competition. The teams which finished bottom of their group in Leagues A and B, as well as the losers from the relegation play-outs of League C, from the 2022–23 season will move down a league, while the group winners of Leagues B, C and D will move up. The remaining teams will stay in their respective leagues.

In an interview with Polish website meczyki.pl, UEFA vice-president Zbigniew Boniek said that all ten teams from CONMEBOL, South America's football federation, could join the UEFA Nations League from the 2024–25 edition of the competition. The plans, which would act as a response to FIFA's biennial World Cup plans, were intended as part of enhanced cooperation between the two organisations following the signing of a memorandum of understanding and the opening of a joint office in London. However, such an expansion was made unlikely after CONMEBOL submitted a request to FIFA to maintain the round-robin qualification format for the 2026 FIFA World Cup. On 25 January 2023, the UEFA Executive Committee confirmed the format for the 2024–25 UEFA Nations League, with no South American teams to be added.

Teams below are ordered within their league by the 2022–23 UEFA Nations League overall ranking.

League A

Group A1

Group A2

Group A3

Group A4

Quarter-finals
The first and second legs will be played in March 2025.

|}

Nations League Finals

The host of the Nations League Finals will be selected from the four qualified teams. The semi-final pairings will be determined by means of an open draw. For scheduling purposes, the host team is allocated to semi-final 1 as the administrative home team.

Bracket

Semi-finals

Third-place play-off

Final

League B

Group B1

Group B2

Group B3

Group B4

League C

Group C1

Group C2

Group C3

Group C4

Ranking of fourth-placed teams

League D

Group D1

Group D2

Promotion/relegation play-offs

The first and second legs will be played in March 2025.

League A vs League B

|}

League B vs League C

|}

Overall ranking
The results of each team will be used to calculate the overall ranking of the competition.

References

External links

2024-25
Nations League
September 2024 sports events in Europe
October 2024 sports events in Europe
November 2024 sports events in Europe
March 2025 sports events in Europe
June 2025 sports events in Europe
Scheduled association football competitions